The Munich East–Deisenhofen railway is a continuously-electrified, double-track, railway in the German state of Bavaria. It connects Munich East station with Deisenhofen and was opened on 10 October 1898.

Today the line is used by Munich S-Bahn trains. The whole length of the line is served by S-Bahn line S 3 (Mammendorf–Holzkirchen). Between Munich East and Munich-Giesing it is also served by line S 7 (Wolfratshausen–Kreuzstraße).

Between Munich East station and the flying junction between Munich-Giesing and Fasangarten stations the line is one of the few in Germany that has traffic running on the left. This feature allows S-Bahn services from München St.-Martin-Straße to be inserted into the S-Bahn line at Munich East while simultaneously reversing to run into the S-Bahn tunnel under central Munich or vice versa.

Notes

Railway lines in Bavaria
Munich S-Bahn lines
Railway lines opened in 1898
1898 establishments in Germany
Buildings and structures in Munich (district)